Tŷ Pont Haearn (meaning: 'Iron Bridge House') is a residential building and is also seventh tallest building in Cardiff, Wales. The building is currently managed by Unite Students. A previous management company temporarily renamed the building commercially as 'Liberty tower' however this name has since been removed. 

The 21-storey building comprises 17 floors of 144 student flats on top of a four-storey public car park.

Construction
The building was proposed in 2003. Construction began in 2004 and was completed in September 2005.

Site
The site was formerly a cold storage facility demolished into the basement of the building and capped as a surface car park, which meant Carillion had to undertake extensive groundworks prior to construction. The project was rendered more complex by its restricted city-centre location on a triangular site, with two sides bound by live railways and very narrow access via Pellett Street.

Structure design
The building has a piled structure and was constructed using traditional building techniques. UNITE sometimes uses modular construction methods on their projects, but this was unsuitable here due to the tight site constraints. The high-rise building has a repetitive design which meant the team became increasingly efficient at the process as the project progressed.

Drywall
During construction, subcontractor Baris installed 50,000 m2 of Knauf plasterboard and systems throughout. Up to 90% of the available wall space throughout Tŷ Pont Haearn has been fitted with 12.5 mm and 15 mm Soundshield fixed to 70mm 'C’-Studs and high performance Twin Frame Partitions to enhance sound reduction values. 12.5 mm Moistureshield is in place throughout all the wet areas of the building, providing protection in internal areas of high humidity, with Shaftwall used for the stairwells and lift shafts.

Completion
On-time delivery of the project was achieved allowing the client to move in the students in time for the new academic year as planned. Handover took place on a Friday night and the students began moving in on Saturday, two days earlier than the scheduled Monday move-in date.

Accommodation
Owned by Liberty Living, Tŷ Pont Haern accommodates 642 students in 144 flats, each with a communal kitchen. The bedrooms are situated in apartments or clusters of three, four, five or six beds and there are also several larger premium bedrooms. 629 students are housed in single study bedrooms and 14 in studio apartments. All rooms include an en-suite shower, toilet and washbasin plus data points for high-speed Internet access. All study bedrooms share a fully fitted kitchen and living area.

Tŷ Pont Haearn is staffed with an on-site management and maintenance team, along with 24-hour security including a CCTV system monitoring the site, electronic entry systems to access the residence plus a staffed reception area 24-hours a day. The residence also provides wheelchair access, a communal living area with Internet access and vending machine, an on-site laundry facility and bike storage.

Location
Tŷ Pont Haearn is in close proximity to higher educational establishments including Cardiff University and Cardiff Metropolitan University. Located on Pellett Street in the heart of the city centre, the residence is close to Cardiff Central railway station. and Cardiff International Arena. The residence is accessible from Junction 29 (Cardiff South) of the M4 motorway.

Tŷ Pont Haearn is the most popular halls of residence for Atrium students due to its location directly opposite it. 350 bedrooms are specifically reserved for Atrium Students, and 179 for UWIC students

See also
List of tallest buildings in Cardiff

References

External links
Wales Online article: Sky-high living for city's students
 

Landmarks in Cardiff
Buildings and structures in Cardiff
Residential skyscrapers in Wales
Apartment buildings in Wales
Residential buildings completed in 2005